Harlan Charles Huckleby (born December 30, 1957) is a former professional American football running back and kick returner who was drafted by the New Orleans Saints of the National Football League (NFL).  Over the course of his NFL career he accumulated nearly 2500 all-purpose yards, with over half of that being return yards. He had played for three Michigan Wolverines football Big Ten Conference Champions.  He also was a member of the Michigan Wolverines track team for one season where he became a Big Ten Champion and All-American as a member of the 4x400m relay race team.  He had also been a four-time Michigan High School Athletic Association (MHSAA) state champion in track and field. He played high school football at Cass Technical High School, graduating in 1975.

High school
At Cass Technical High School he won the Class A MHSAA 220 yard dash both as a junior in 1974 and a senior in 1975.  As a senior, he also won the state championship in the 100 yard dash and the 4x110 yard relay as a senior in 1975.  He also competed in the Amateur Athletic Union Junior Championships in 1974 placing fifth in the 440 yard dash.

College

Huckleby started 30 games for Bo Schembechler's consecutive Big Ten Conference champion Michigan Wolverines from the 1976 through 1978 seasons.  During his Michigan Wolverines Career he accumulated a total of 2624 yards rushing, including twenty-five touchdowns and nine 100-yard games.  He saw limited action in his three Rose Bowls.  When the Wolverines beat Northwestern Wildcats, 69–0, in week six of the 1975 season it was the first time in Michigan history that the Wolverines had three backs who each rushed for at least 100 yards. Harlan Huckleby gained 157 yards, and Michigan tied the modern Big Ten record of 573 rushing yards in the game. Huckleby was the leading rusher for Michigan in both of the games in which Michigan had three rushers accumulate 100 yards.

In track, Huckleby was a member of the 1976 Men's track team.  The Men won the Big Ten Conference titles in both indoor and outdoor track that season.  Huckleby's 4x400m relay team won the indoor Big Ten Championship race and placed third at the National Collegiate Athletic Association Championships.  Huckleby earned All-American honors for this.  Although the team won both Big Ten track titles in 1978 Huckleby was not a member of the team.

Professional career
He was drafted in the fifth round of the 1979 NFL Draft by the New Orleans Saints.  He did not play for the Saints during the 1979 NFL season, but instead played for the CFL's Saskatchewan Roughriders for eight games in 1979. He played for the Green Bay Packers during the 1980-1985 NFL seasons. During 84 games over the course of six seasons, Huckleby accumulated ten touchdowns and 779 yards rushing on 242 carries, three touchdowns and 411 yards on 53 receptions, and 1300 kickoff return yards.  Although he only totaled 13 career NFL touchdowns in his 84 games, he scored multiple touchdowns a few times, including three in one game once.  During the 1981 NFL season, his 5 rushing touchdowns led the Packers and his 8 total touchdowns tied for the team lead with James Lofton.  During his first four seasons with Bart Starr as coach the team reached the playoffs once.  The team did not reach the playoffs either of his final two seasons with Forrest Gregg as coach.  During the 1982 NFL season the Packers reached the second round of the 1982-83 NFL Playoffs.

See also
Lists of Michigan Wolverines football rushing leaders

Notes

External links
Just Sports Stats

1957 births
American football return specialists
American football running backs
Canadian football running backs
Cass Technical High School alumni
Green Bay Packers players
Living people
Michigan Wolverines football players
Michigan Wolverines men's track and field athletes
Saskatchewan Roughriders players
Players of American football from Detroit